SAHF may refer to:

Saudi Arabian Handball Federation, a handball governing body in Saudi Arabia
Syrian Arab Handball Federation, a handball governing body in Syria
South African Handball Federation, a handball governing body in South Africa
Scandinavian-American Hall of Fame, an award in the North American continent
South Asian Health Foundation, a charity in the United Kingdom